Green Flag Aviation Co. Ltd. is an air transport service company based in Khartoum, Sudan, established in 1992.

The company was added to the EU list of banned air carriers on 30 March 2010.

Fleet
Green Flag's fleet consists of:
2 Antonov An-74
1 Ilyushin Il-76 (cargo)
5 Mil Mi-17
1 Antonov An-30
1 Lockheed Jetstar
2 Bell-205
1 Dassault Falcon 50
1 Boeing 737 (Cargo)

References

External links
 Company website
 Green Flag Aviation on Facebook

Airlines established in 1992
Airlines of Sudan
Companies based in Khartoum